Soszyca is a non-operational PKP railway station in Soszyca (Pomeranian Voivodeship), Poland.

Lines crossing the station

References 
Soszyca article at Polish Stations Database, URL accessed at 27 March 2006

Railway stations in Pomeranian Voivodeship
Disused railway stations in Pomeranian Voivodeship
Bytów County